Monsieur is a 1964 comedy film directed by Jean-Paul Le Chanois and starring Jean Gabin, Liselotte Pulver and Mireille Darc.

It was made as a co-production between France, Italy and West Germany.

The film's sets were designed by Jean Mandaroux.

Plot
Overwhelmed by the death of his wife, a rich Parisian banker called René Duchêne is walking towards the River Seine to throw himself in when he is accosted by a prostitute. They recognise each other, because she used to be the chambermaid. When she learns that her former mistress is dead, she reveals that the wife he adored had made him a laughing stock by her multiple adulteries. He decides to let the world think he has committed suicide and to go into hiding.

Answering an advertisement for a couple to be butler and maid in a country house, he is hired under the name of Georges Baudin, with Suzanne posing as his daughter to be the maid. Their employers are Edmond Bernadac, a rich and staid businessman, and his flighty new Swiss wife Elisabeth, a former air hostess who is fond of alcohol and men.

Their new butler rapidly becomes indispensable at smoothing over the continual problems which beset the household, one being that the son of the house immediately wants to marry Suzanne and has therefore to win the permission of her supposed father. He meanwhile has to contend with problems at home, where his dead wife's parents have moved in and claim to be his heirs. In the end he has to come back to life in order to thwart them and to allow Suzanne to marry the boy she loves.

Cast
 Jean Gabin as Monsieur 
 Liselotte Pulver as Elizabeth Bernadac
 Mireille Darc as Suzanne 
 Philippe Noiret as Edmond Bernadac 
 Gaby Morlay as Madame Bernadac mère 
 Gabrielle Dorziat as La belle-mère 
 Peter Vogel as Michel Corbeil 
 Marina Berti as Madame Danoni 
 Claudio Gora as Danoni 
 Berthe Granval as Nathalie Bernadac 
 Jean-Paul Moulinot as Me Flamand, le notaire 
 Jean-Pierre Darras as José 
 Henri Crémieux as Le beau-père 
 Heinz Blau as Alain Bernadac 
 Maryse Martin as Justine 
 Andrex as Antoine 
 Alain Bouvette as Marc 
 Jean Lefebvre as Le detective privé 
 Max Elder as Le valet de chambre 
 Armand Meffre as Le patron du bistrot 
 Jean Champion as Le patron de l'hôtel 
 Pierre Moncorbier as Le serrurier 
 Angela Minervini as La serveuse du snack 
 Christian Brocard as Un client sans-gêne 
 André Dalibert as Le tailleur 
 Paul Faivre as Le curé 
 Michel Nastorg as Le docteur 
 Raoul Henry as L'invité Bretteville 
 René Fleur as Le décorateur

References

Bibliography 
 Bock, Hans-Michael & Bergfelder, Tim. The Concise CineGraph. Encyclopedia of German Cinema. Berghahn Books, 2009.

External links 
 

1964 films
1964 comedy films
German comedy films
West German films
Italian comedy films
1960s French-language films
Films directed by Jean-Paul Le Chanois
French comedy films
Films set in Paris
1960s French films
1960s Italian films
1960s German films